Archive is a compilation album by The Specials, released in 2001 (see 2001 in music). It consists of old Specials songs and ones by the new line-up, mostly covers.

Track listing

Personnel 

 Terry Hall - vocals
 Jerry Dammers - keyboards
 Lynval Golding - rhythm guitar, vocals
 Neville Staple - toasting, backing vocals, percussion
 Roddy Byers - lead guitar
 Horace Panter - bass guitar
 John Bradbury - drums

References

2001 compilation albums
The Specials compilation albums